Jan Antolec (born 3 May 1990) is a Polish cross-country skier. He competed at the FIS Nordic World Ski Championships 2013 in Val di Fiemme, and at the 2014 Winter Olympics in Sochi, in 30 kilometre skiathlon and 4 × 10 kilometre relay.

Antolec was born in Nowy Targ.

References 

1990 births
Living people
Cross-country skiers at the 2014 Winter Olympics
Polish male cross-country skiers
Olympic cross-country skiers of Poland
People from Nowy Targ
Competitors at the 2015 Winter Universiade